Scantic may refer to

Places
Scantic, Connecticut
Scantic River State Park, Massachusetts

Rivers
Scantic River, Massachusetts

Ships
, a Danish coaster in service 1963-64